2017 Thai League 4 Southern Region is the 8th season of the League competition since its establishment in 2009. It is in the fourth tier of the Thai football league system.

Changes from last season

Promoted clubs
Four club was promoted to the 2017 Thai League 3 Southern Region.
 Surat Thani
 Nara United
 Trang
 Ranong United

Relegated clubs
 Nakhon Si Heritage were relegated to the Thailand Amateur League.

Relocated clubs
 Chumphon were moved from the Western Region 2016.
 Sinthana Kabinburi were moved from the Bangkok & Eastern 2016.

Renamed clubs
 Surat Thani City authorize from Sinthana Kabinburi

Withdrawn clubs
 Phang Nga Club-licensing football club didn't pass to play 2017 Thai League 4 Southern Region so this club is taking a 1-year break.

Expansion clubs
 Surat Thani United was promoted from the 2016 Thai Division 3 Tournament Southern Region Winner but this Club-licensing club didn't pass. Sungaipadee, which 2016 Thai Division 3 Tournament Southern Region Runner-up, was replaced this quota.

Teams

Stadium and locations

Sponsoring

League table

Standings

Positions by round

The table lists the positions of teams after each week of matches. In order to preserve chronological evolvements, any postponed matches are not included in the round at which they were originally scheduled, but added to the full round they were played immediately afterwards. For example, if a match is scheduled for matchday 13, but then postponed and played between days 16 and 17, it will be added to the standings for day 16.

Source: Thai League 4

Results by match played

Source: Thai League 4

Results
In the third leg, the winner on head-to-head result of the first and the second leg will be home team. If head-to-head result are tie, must to find the home team from head-to-head goals different. If all of head-to-head still tie, must to find the home team from penalty kickoff on the end of each second leg match (This penalty kickoff don't bring to calculate points on league table, it's only the process to find the home team on third leg).

First and second legs

Third leg

Season statistics

Top goal scorers
As of 9 September 2017.

Hat-tricks

Attendance

Overall statistics

Attendance by home match played

Source: Thai League 4
Note: Some error of T4 official match report 6 May 2017 (Yala United 1–0 Phuket).
 Some error of T4 official match report 6 August 2017 (Satun United 3–0 Phattalung).
 Some error of T4 official match report 16 August 2017 (Hatyai 2–1 Sungaipadee).
 Some error of T4 official match report 27 August 2017 (Phuket 1–1 Hatyai).

See also
 2017 Thai League
 2017 Thai League 2
 2017 Thai League 3
 2017 Thai League 4
 2017 Thailand Amateur League
 2017 Thai FA Cup
 2017 Thai League Cup
 2017 Thailand Champions Cup

References

External links
 Division 2
 http://fathailand.org/news/97
 http://www.thailandsusu.com/webboard/index.php?topic=379167.0
Clubs data from Thai League 4 official website

Chumphon
Hatyai
Pattani
Phattalung
Phuket
Satun United
Sungaipadee
Surat Thani City
Yala United

Regional League South Division seasons